Location: Marion, NC
League: Western Carolina League 1948–1952; Tar Heel League 1953-1954
Affiliation: Baltimore Orioles, 1954
Ballpark: Marion Municipal Stadium 

The Marion Marauders were a Class D Minor League baseball team based in Marion, North Carolina. During their existence from 1948 to 1954, they had an overall record of 361–333. Their most successful season was in 1953, when they won the Tar Heel League regular season, and saw their star pitcher Kelly Jack Swift go 30–7 with a 2.54 ERA, winning the pitching Triple Crown. Swift still remains the last 30-game winner in Minor League baseball history. The team folded along with the rest of the Tar Heel League on June 21, 1954.

Year–by–year records

References

Defunct Western Carolinas League teams
Baltimore Orioles minor league affiliates
Professional baseball teams in North Carolina
Defunct minor league baseball teams
Defunct baseball teams in North Carolina
Baseball teams disestablished in 1954
Baseball teams established in 1948
Tar Heel League teams